Oliver The Eighth is a 1934 American pre-Code short film comedy starring Laurel and Hardy. It was directed by Lloyd French, produced by Hal Roach and distributed by MGM.

Plot 
Laurel and Hardy are partners in a barbershop. Stan reads a classified ad in the newspaper from a wealthy widow (Mae Busch) looking for a new husband. Initially, only Stan plans to respond to the ad but after explaining his plans to Ollie (leading to the third use of the team's trademark "Tell me that again" routine, used previously in Towed in a Hole, The Devil's Brother, and subsequently in The Fixer Uppers) they both decide to answer the ad, shaking hands in agreement, and with Ollie saying "May the best man win." However, Ollie cheats on this agreement by mailing only his own response, and hiding Stan's in his hat. Ollie then settles into the barber's chair for Stan to shave him, and inadvertently dozes off.

The widow invites Ollie to her mansion, and Ollie announces himself with his full true name: Oliver Norvell Hardy.

Stan discovers his unmailed response, he also goes along and demands half of whatever Ollie gets. At the widow's mansion, Laurel and Hardy encounter a deranged butler (Jack Barty) named "Jitters" who pantomimes card tricks with imaginary cards, and serves an imaginary meal. (At one point, Stan attempts to look into the soup pot to see if it actually is empty, but gets smartly beaned on the top of his head with the ladle by Jitters.) The same butler tips off Stan and Ollie that the widow is a serial killer, who had previously cut the throats of seven prior fiancés --- all named Oliver --- in revenge for her first fiancé's having left her on the evening before their wedding.

Laurel and Hardy are sent upstairs, as the widow tells her butler to make sure all the doors and windows are locked. She tells Ollie, "I hope you have a nice, long sleep", as the butler plays "Taps" (a bugle call played at dusk) on a trumpet. As the butler locks the boys in their room, he bids them "Goodbye" instead of "Goodnight".

Unable to escape their bedroom, Stan finds a pump-action shotgun, leading to some slapstick mishaps, including Stan accidentally shooting Ollie in the foot (which he mistook for an intruder's hand). They plan to take turns sleeping, so that one of them can watch out for the knife-wielding widow.

Ollie sets up a Rube Goldberg-style contraption to help Stan to stay awake, tying a gold-coated brick (which Stan --- thinking it was a real gold bar --- had naively accepted from a con-man as payment for their barber shop) to a string, suspending it above Stan's head and then tying the other end of the string round a lit candle. Ollie then explains to Stan that he must periodically move the string down along the dandle in order to prevent the candle's flame burning through the string, resulting in the brick falling on Stan's head.

As usual, things go awry with the brick falling on Ollie's head, knocking him unconscious. Moments later, the widow comes walking up the stairs, sharpening a long knife. When Stan goes to get the shotgun, he gets locked in the closet as the widow enters the room. As she is about to cut Ollie's throat, a loud gunshot is heard from the closet, startling her and she starts to turn her head in the direction of the closet.

Suddenly, Stan and Ollie are back at their barbershop, and Ollie leaps out of his chair, screaming and runs to the mirror to examine his throat. He explains to Stan, "I just had a terrible dream."

Cast 
 Stan Laurel as Stanley 
 Oliver Hardy as Ollie
 Mae Busch as Mrs. Fox, the widow
 Jack Barty as Jitters, the butler

References

External links 
 
 
 

1934 films
1934 comedy films
American black-and-white films
Films directed by Lloyd French
Laurel and Hardy (film series)
Metro-Goldwyn-Mayer films
American comedy short films
1930s comedy horror films
1930s English-language films
1930s American films